Eloise Psychiatric Hospital was a large complex located in Westland, Michigan. It was named after Eloise Dickerson Davock, the daughter of Detroit's postmaster.

It operated from 1839 to early 1982. Starting out as a poor house and farm, it eventually developed into an asylum, sanatorium and hospital. In 1832 it was called the Wayne County Poorhouse; in 1872 it was the Wayne County Alms House; in 1886 it was referred to simply as the Wayne County House.  In 1913 there were three divisions: The Eloise Hospital (Mental Hospital), the Eloise Infirmary (Poorhouse) and the Eloise Sanatorium (T.B. Hospital) which were collectively called Eloise. In 1945 it was named Wayne County General Hospital and Infirmary at Eloise, Michigan.  In 1974 it had two divisions - the Wayne County General Hospital and the Wayne County Psychiatric Hospital. In 1979 it was officially called Wayne County General Hospital with the psychiatric division closing in 1982. In its prime, Eloise consisted of 78 buildings on 902 acres with 10,000 patients along with 2,000 staff. It was the largest psychiatric facility in the United States.  Only five of the 78 buildings and the Eloise Cemetery remain. The firehouse, power plant, commissary and D buildings still stand as of July, 2021. The bakery was burned down due to arson in 2020.

The History of Eloise
The Wayne County Poor House was founded in 1832. It was located at Gratiot and Mt. Elliott Avenues in Hamtramck Township two miles from the Detroit city limits. The Black Horse Tavern which served as a stagecoach stop between Detroit and Chicago was located on the property. In those days it was a two-day stagecoach ride from Hamtramck Township to Nankin Township. The register shows that on April 11, 1839 35 people were transferred from the poorhouse in Hamtramck Township to the new one in Nankin Township.  111 apparently refused to go to the "awful wilderness." Many were children and homes among the residents of the city may have been found for them. The log cabin which was formerly the Black Horse Tavern became the keeper's quarters and in 1839 an A frame building was put up to house the inmates  more appropriately termed, by today's standards, patients. An A frame cookhouse was erected in the back of the log building and was used for cooking by both inmates, staff and the keeper's family.

The complex was self-sufficient. It had its own police and fire departments along with a railroad and trolley system. It included a bakery, amusement hall, laundry facility, post office and a power plant.  It had its own farm which included a dairy herd, dairy barns, piggery, root cellar, tobacco curing building and greenhouses. Patients came from Detroit and other communities to have x-rays done.  It also housed the first kidney dialysis unit in the State of Michigan and pioneered the use of music therapy. Staff also used hydrotherapy, shock therapy and insulin therapy to treat patients.

As the years went on the institution grew larger and larger, a reflection in the increases in the population of the Detroit area.  From only 35 residents in 1839 the complex grew to about 10,000 residents at its peak during the Great Depression. Slowly over the next 40 years Eloise's population decreased. The farm operations ceased in 1958 and some of the large psychiatric buildings were vacated in 1973. The psychiatric division started closing in 1977 with the last patients being transferred out in 1982 when the State of Michigan took over. The general hospital closed in 1986.

Inventor Elijah McCoy may be its most famous former resident.  He spent a year prior to his death as a patient in the Eloise Infirmary. There were other well-known people who died at Eloise including several baseball players.  Among them are Jul Kustus, Larry LeJeune, Charlie Krause, and Marty Kavanagh.  Musician Horace Flinders was also a patient, and received music therapy.

Eloise present day

Today the land that once was Eloise has been developed into a strip mall, a golf course, and condominiums. There is only one building currently in use.  "D" Building (the Kay Beard Building) was used for psychiatric admissions, housed 400 patients and had living quarters for some employees like the Catholic chaplain. Later it was used by Wayne County for administration until 2016. The Kay Beard Building was closed in October 2016.  The old commissary building is currently being used as a family homeless shelter.

The firehouse (former psychiatric facility laundry), and the power plant are still standing in decay.  The bakery was heavily damaged due to arson in April 2016, with charred ruins still standing as of March 16, 2021 (however, there are plans to raze and remove the remainder).  The Eloise smokestack  emblazoned Eloise in brick  was deemed to be a hazard and was demolished in 2006.

In 1979, the Walter P. Reuther Psychiatric Hospital, located near the northwest end of the former Eloise property, just southeast of the intersection of Merriman and Palmer Roads, was opened. The facility is currently operated by the Michigan Department of Community Health. In 1996, Oakwood Health System (later merged into Beaumont Health) opened an outpatient facility, the Adams Child & Adolescent Health Center, on the corner of Merriman and Palmer near Reuther Hospital. Both facilities have Palmer Road addresses.

Eloise is featured in the book Annie's Ghosts: A Journey Into a Family Secret by Steve Luxenberg, which is about Luxenberg's secret aunt who was committed to the Eloise psychiatric hospital in the 1940s.

The site is marked by a Michigan Historic Marker.

The site and the adjoining Eloise Cemetery are reputed to be haunted.  Haunted "tours" of the Kay Beard Building are offered periodically throughout the year, particularly near Halloween.

As of 2021, the Kay Beard Building contains a haunted attraction based on the embellished history of the asylum.

In popular culture
It also inspired the horror movie Eloise. The film stars Eliza Dushku, Robert Patrick, Chace Crawford, Brandon T. Jackson, Nicole Forester, and P. J. Byrne. The film was released on February 3, 2017, by Vertical Entertainment.

References
Citations

References

Further reading

External links
 Caring for the County’s Poor: a character repository of Eloise
 History of Eloise  Westland, Michigan
 
 
The Tales of Eloise

Hospital buildings completed in 1894
Government buildings completed in 1894
Buildings and structures in Wayne County, Michigan
County government buildings in Michigan
Former psychiatric hospitals
History of mental health in the United States
Poor farms
Psychiatric hospitals in Michigan
Reportedly haunted locations in Michigan